Zelgniewo  is a village in the administrative district of Gmina Kaczory, within Piła County, Greater Poland Voivodeship, in west-central Poland. The population was 469 at the 2011 census.

References

Zelgniewo